This article is a timeline of the National Football League (NFL). It tracks the history of each of the league's 32 current franchises from the early days of the league, through its merger with the American Football League (AFL). The history of franchises that began as independent teams, or as members of the Ohio League, New York Pro Football League, and other defunct leagues are shown as well.

NFL timeline

1920–1931: The Birth of the NFL

1920
The American Professional Football Association is formed. The fourteen teams were mainly drawn from the Ohio League, Chicago Circuit, New York Pro Football League and other teams from the lower midwest. A $100 membership fee was charged. The Chicago Tigers folded after the season.

1921

Number of teams increased to 21. Four teams lasted only one season. Tonawanda Kardex in particular only lasted one game, making it the shortest running NFL franchise to date. Three other franchises folded.

1922

The APFA was renamed the National Football League.  Four new franchises awarded.

1923

A new and distinct Cleveland Indians franchise was formed. Two other teams joined the NFL, the Duluth Kelleys and the St. Louis All Stars. The St. Louis team folded after one season.

1924

Before the season, the owner of the Cleveland Indians bought the Canton Bulldogs and "mothballed" it, taking the team's nickname and players to Cleveland for the season. The Canton Bulldogs had won the NFL championship in 1923, and won it again as the Cleveland Bulldogs in 1924.

1925
The Canton Bulldogs were reactivated. Four other franchises were awarded. This was the final season for the Rochester Jeffersons.

1926

The league grew to 22 teams, a figure that would not be equaled in professional football until 1961, adding the Brooklyn Lions, the Hartford Blues, the Los Angeles Buccaneers, and the Louisville Colonels, with Racine Tornadoes re-entering.

1927

Prior to the season, the league decided to eliminate the financially weaker teams. As a result, the league dropped from 22 to 12 teams, and a majority of the remaining teams were centered around the East Coast instead of the Midwest, where the NFL had started. The New York Yankees were added from the American Football League and the Cleveland Bulldogs returned.

1928
The NFL drops to ten teams. Two teams had folded, the Buffalo Bisons sat out the season and the Cleveland Bulldogs moved and played as the Detroit Wolverines.

1929
The league increased back to 12 teams with the addition of two franchises, the Staten Island Stapletons, and the Orange Tornadoes. Two mothballed teams activated for the season. Minneapolis re-entered as the Red Jackets and the re-entry of the Buffalo Bisons.

1930

Prior to the season, Brooklyn businessmen William B. Dwyer and John C. Depler bought the Dayton Triangles, moved it, and renamed it the Brooklyn Dodgers. The Orange Tornadoes relocated to Newark. The Portsmouth Spartans entered as a new team.

1931
The league decreased to 10 teams due to financial hardships caused by the Great Depression. While the Cleveland Indians joined as an expansion team, the league lost the Minneapolis Red Jackets and the Newark Tornadoes, and the Frankford Yellow Jackets folded midway through the season.

The Championships Starts

1932 

The Boston Braves enfranchised.

1933 

Three new teams enfranchised:
Cincinnati Reds 
Philadelphia Eagles
Pittsburgh Pirates
League split into Eastern and Western Divisions
First season in history of the league no team folds or suspends operations

1934 

 Portsmouth Spartans moved to Detroit; renamed the Lions
 Cincinnati Reds cease operations during season, and are replaced by the St Louis Gunners for the final 3 games.

1935–1936 

 Neither Cincinnati Reds nor St. Louis Gunners return for 1935 season.

1937–1939 

 Cleveland Rams enfranchised
 Boston Redskins move to Washington, D.C.

The 1940s: World War II mergers

1940–1942

1943 

 Philadelphia and Pittsburgh merge to form "Phil-Pitt"

1944 

 Boston Yanks enfranchised.
 Cleveland Rams resume operations.
 Steagles end merger, Eagles resume operations
 Steelers merge with Cardinals to form "Card-Pitt"

1945 

 Card-Pitt splits into Chicago Cardinals and Pittsburgh Steelers
 Brooklyn Tigers merge with Boston Yanks, named simply "The Yanks"

1946–1948 

 Brooklyn Tigers cease operations
 Boston Yanks resume normal operations
 Cleveland Rams move to Los Angeles

1949 

 Boston Yanks cease operations
 New York Bulldogs enfranchised from the remains of the Boston Yanks

The 1950s: AAFC merger

1950 

Eastern Division renamed to American Conference
Western Division renamed to National Conference
 San Francisco 49ers, Cleveland Browns, and the first Baltimore Colts all enfranchised from now-defunct All-America Football Conference. The Colts fold after the 1950 season.
 New York Bulldogs change name to New York Yanks, move to National Conference
 Chicago Cardinals move to American Conference

1951 

 The New York Yanks fold after the 1951 season.

1952 

 Dallas Texans enfranchised with the remains of the now-defunct New York Yanks, but fold after one season and to date last NFL team to fold.

1953–1959 

 American Conference renamed the Eastern Conference
 National Conference renamed the Western Conference
 A second and distinct Baltimore Colts team enfranchised from the remains of the Dallas Texans

The 1960s: NFL and AFL

1960 

 American Football League (AFL) begins operations with eight teams as a rival to the NFL.
 Dallas Cowboys enfranchised by NFL
 Chicago Cardinals move to St. Louis

1961–1962 

 NFL enfranchises the Minnesota Vikings
 Los Angeles Chargers move to San Diego
 Dallas Cowboys move to Eastern Division

1963–1965 

 Dallas Texans move to Kansas City; renamed the Chiefs
 Titans of New York renamed New York Jets

1966 

 Atlanta Falcons enfranchised by NFL
 Miami Dolphins enfranchised by AFL
First AFL-NFL championship game played.

1967 

NFL Eastern Conference divided into Capitol and Century Divisions
NFL Western Conference divided into Coastal and Central Divisions
New Orleans Saints enfranchised by NFL
Atlanta Falcons move to Western Conference

1968 

Cincinnati Bengals are enfranchised by AFL
New York Giants move to Capitol Division
New Orleans Saints move to Century Division

1969 

 New York Giants move back to Century Division
 New Orleans moves back to Capitol Division

The 1970s: AFL–NFL merger

1970 

 AFL and NFL merge
 AFL Eastern and Western Divisions become AFC East and AFC West, respectively
 AFC Central formed.
 NFL Century Division teams split up between AFC Central and NFC East
 NFL Capitol Division becomes nucleus of NFC East
 NFL Central Division becomes NFC Central
 NFL Coastal Division becomes nucleus of NFC West 
 Houston moves from AFL East to AFC Central
 Cincinnati moves from AFL West to AFC Central
 New Orleans moves from NFL Capitol to NFC West
 Cleveland moves from NFL Century to AFC Central
 New York Giants move from NFL Century to NFC East
 Pittsburgh moves from NFL Century to AFC Central
 St. Louis moves from NFL Century to NFC East
 Baltimore moves from NFL Coastal to AFC East

1971–1975 

 Boston Patriots are renamed New England Patriots.

1976 

 Seattle Seahawks are enfranchised
 Tampa Bay Buccaneers are enfranchised

1977–1981 

 Seattle moves from NFC West to AFC West
 Tampa Bay moves from AFC West to NFC Central

The 1980s and 1990s

1982–1983 

 Oakland Raiders move to Los Angeles.

1984–1987 

 Baltimore Colts move to Indianapolis

1988–1993 

 St. Louis Cardinals move to Phoenix

1994 

 Phoenix Cardinals renamed Arizona Cardinals

1995 

 Carolina Panthers enfranchised
 Jacksonville Jaguars enfranchised
 Los Angeles Raiders move back to Oakland
 Los Angeles Rams move to St. Louis

1996 

 Cleveland Browns franchise deactivated
 Baltimore Ravens enfranchised with remains of deactivated Cleveland Browns

1997–1998 

 Houston Oilers announce that they will move to Nashville and are renamed the Tennessee Oilers. They play the 1997 season in Memphis and the 1998 season at Vanderbilt Stadium in Nashville while a new stadium is built in Nashville.

1999–2001 

 Cleveland Browns franchise reinstated
 Tennessee Oilers renamed Tennessee Titans

The 2000s: Realignment

2002–2015 

 The NFL realigns to create four divisions with four teams each in both conferences.
 Arizona (NFC East) and Seattle (AFC West) join the NFC West
 NFC Central renamed NFC North
 AFC Central renamed AFC North
 NFC South created
 Tampa Bay moves from the old NFC Central
 New Orleans, Atlanta, and Carolina move from the NFC West
 AFC South created
 Jacksonville and Tennessee move from the old AFC Central
 Indianapolis moves from the AFC East 
 Houston Texans enfranchised

2016
 St. Louis Rams return to Los Angeles after 21 seasons.

2017–2019
 San Diego Chargers return to Los Angeles after 56 seasons.

2020–2021
 Oakland Raiders move to Las Vegas.
 Washington Redskins adopt the temporary name of Washington Football Team in response to controversy over their previous name.

2022–present
 Washington Football Team renamed Washington Commanders.

See also
 History of the National Football League
 NFL franchise moves and mergers
 Defunct NFL franchises
 Timeline of Major League Baseball
 Timeline of the National Basketball Association
 History of organizational changes in the NHL

References

National Football League lists
National Football League